The Hello CD of the Month Club, also known as the Hello Recording Club or simply Hello, was a subscription-only record company that operated from 1993 to 1996. Hello was organised by John Flansburgh of They Might Be Giants and Marjorie Galen. Members of Hello received monthly issues of CD extended plays, each containing four or five songs by a particular artist. These EPs were exclusive to Hello.

Company history 
John Flansburgh founded the Hello CD of the Month Club with Marjorie Galen in 1993 as a way to provide an outlet for his solo material — Hello issued four Mono Puff releases, as well as two EPs by Flansburgh's bandmate John Linnell — while also providing a platform for both established musicians signed to other labels and new artists. Galen and Flansburgh originally intended Hello to be a standard independent label. However, this was not financially plausible, so Hello adopted a subscription model instead. Although Flansburgh and Galen had to seek out artists for Hello's first year of operation, by 1994, musicians were contacting the label themselves. In its first year, the label faced difficulties with understaffing.

Flansburgh has stated that the purpose of Hello was to produce and distribute music projects cheaply for the artist and the consumer. Hello only produced as many discs as the number of subscribers. It did not achieve outstanding financial success; however, Flansburgh reported that the label was in the black. Proceeds from They Might Be Giants' 1985 Demo Tape, an optional addition to 1994 subscriptions, were donated to the People With AIDS Coalition.

The label dissolved after its 1996 subscription year due to a level of demand that the small label could no longer service. Some members did not receive the final 1996 releases till May 1997. For a brief time afterward, the Hello back catalogue was still available for purchase. Over the span of Hello's existence, it issued releases from thirty-four different artists.

Release history 
Hello produced thirty-nine EPs over four years, as well as two promotional samplers, a promotional copy of a full-length Mono Puff album, and one compilation of original material by various artists. Hello also issued a live sampler from They Might Be Giants, and reissued their 1985 Demo Tape on cassette.

1993

1994

1995

1996

See also
 List of record labels

References

External links
 The Hello Recording Club article on This Might Be A Wiki

American record labels
Record labels established in 1993
Record labels disestablished in 1996
Alternative rock record labels